NETC may refer to:
 Naval Education and Training Command
 National Emergency Training Center
 Northeastern Technical College, netc.edu
 Net-C, French webmail
 One World Conservation Center, formerly New England Tropical Conservatory
 Nebraska Educational Telecommunications Commission, operates the Nebraska Public Media
 Newport Naval Education/Training Center, at Naval Station Newport
 New England Theatre Conference, as mentioned at Kearsarge Arts Theatre Company and Ogunquit Playhouse
 North-East Transmission Company Limited, supported the ONGC Tripura Power Company, Palatana, Udaipur, Tripura, India